Sternbergia candida is a bulbous flowering plant in the family Amaryllidaceae, subfamily Amaryllidoideae, which is used as an ornamental. It has white flowers which appear in spring.

Description

Sternbergia candida is a rare plant which occurs only in south-west Turkey, where it grows at around 1100 m, on the edges of cedar woods. It was only discovered a few years before being named in 1979 (by Brian Mathew and Turhan Baytop). The slightly twisted grey-green leaves appear in late winter to early spring and are about 1 cm wide. White flowers follow the leaves, normally in January to February in their native habitat, on stems up to 20 cm. The flowers may be scented.

Cultivation
Sternbergia candida is not reliably hardy in countries subject to frost and is then recommended for culture under the protection of at least a cold greenhouse or frame. It is propagated by bulb division.

References

Amaryllidoideae